Lee Ki-taek is a South Korean actor and model. He is known for his roles in dramas such as The Devil Judge, One Fine Week 2, Moonshine and Three Bold Siblings.

Filmography

Television series

Web series

Music video appearances

References

External links 
 
 

1994 births
21st-century South Korean male actors
Living people
South Korean male television actors
South Korean male models